The Pascagoula River is a river, about 80 miles (130 km) long, in southeastern Mississippi in the United States.  The river drains an area of about 8,800 square miles (23,000 km²) and flows into Mississippi Sound of the Gulf of Mexico.  The Pascagoula River Basin is managed by the Pat Harrison Waterway District.

As a result, the Pascagoula has, in modern times, been the focus of a great deal of effort regarding its conservation to prevent the construction of dams on it.

The water district manager has proposed the construction of a couple of dams on tributaries called the Big and the Little Cedar creeks to manage the river's flow during a drought crisis. Since 1999 the water level in the river has fallen as low as 1.15 ft (on September 6, 2015) and 0.2 ft (October 8, 2000), as measured at the Graham Ferry gauge.

George and Jackson counties, the two counties closest to the Gulf, have two separate wildlife management areas called Water trails that provide controlled recreation such as camping, birding, or canoeing.

Course

The Pascagoula River is formed in northwestern George County, just north of the Merrill community, by the confluence of the Leaf and Chickasawhay Rivers and flows generally southward through swampy bottomlands in George and Jackson Counties.  In its lower course the river forms several channels and bayous; its largest such distributary is the West Pascagoula River, which flows into the Mississippi Sound at Gautier.  The main channel passes Escatawpa and Moss Point and flows into the sound at Pascagoula. At low water the tidal effects are felt more than forty miles upstream.

Name
Pascagoula is a name derived from the Choctaw language meaning "bread people".

According to the Geographic Names Information System, the river has also been known as:
East Pascagoula River (below the branching off the West Pascagoula River)
Fiume Pescagoula
Pasca Oocooloo River
Pascoboula River
Paska Okla River
Paspagola River
Pasquagola River
Rio de Pascagula
Riviere des Pascagoula
Riviere des Pascagoulas
Singing River (lower 8 miles of the river)

History
According to local Euro-American legend, the peace-loving Pascagoula tribe walked single file into the Singing River because the local Biloxi tribe were planning to attack. Anola, a Biloxi "princess", eloped with the Pascagoula chief Altama, although she was engaged to a Biloxi chieftain. Anola's angry would-be husband led his soldiers into battle with the Pascagoula. Outnumbered and fearing enslavement by the Biloxi, the tribe joined hands and walked into the river singing a death song. This section of the Pascagoula River became known as the "Singing River" because of this death song, which reportedly can still be heard at night.

See also 

 List of Mississippi rivers
 Pascagoula Abduction
 South Atlantic-Gulf Water Resource Region

References

Landforms of George County, Mississippi
Landforms of Jackson County, Mississippi
Rivers of Mississippi
Drainage basins of the Gulf of Mexico
Mississippi placenames of Native American origin